3-Hydroxy-16-methoxy-2,3-dihydrotabersonine is a terpene indole alkaloid produced by Catharanthus roseus.  The metabolite is a substrate for 3-hydroxy-16-methoxy-2,3-dihydrotabersonine N-methyltransferase (NMT) which transfers a methyl group to the nitrogen of the indole ring forming desacetoxyvindoline.  The enzyme catalyzing the formation of 3-hydroxy-16-methoxy-2,3-dihydrotabersonine from 16-methoxytabersonine is currently unknown, but is a result of hydration of the double bond connecting the 6 and 13 position carbons.

References

Indole alkaloids
Heterocyclic compounds with 5 rings
Nitrogen heterocycles
Methyl esters
Methoxy compounds